is a Japanese professional baseball Outfielder for the Fukuoka SoftBank Hawks of Nippon Professional Baseball (NPB).

Early baseball career
Masaki went on to Keio University and won the 50th Meiji Jingu Baseball Tournament in his sophomore year. He hit two home runs in the 70th Japan National Collegiate Baseball Championship during his senior year, helping Keio University win its first championship in 34 years. He was also awarded as the Most valuable player at this tournament.

Professional career
On October 11, 2021, Masaki was drafted by the Fukuoka Softbank Hawks in the 2021 Nippon Professional Baseball draft.

On April 7, 2022, Masaki made his first league debut in the Pacific League against the Orix Buffaloes, as a starting lineup for the No.3 and left fielder. On April 9, he played as a no.8 and designated hitter against the Saitama Seibu Lions and recorded his first hit. On August 24, he recorded his first home run against the Tohoku Rakuten Golden Eagles. Masaki finished his rookie year with a .254 batting average, three home runs, and five runs batted in in 35 regular season games.

References

External links

 Career statistics - NPB.jp
 31 Tomoya Masaki PLAYERS2022 - Fukuoka SoftBank Hawks Official site

1999 births
Living people
Keio University alumni
Fukuoka SoftBank Hawks players
Japanese baseball players
Nippon Professional Baseball outfielders
Baseball people from Tokyo